Indotyphlops is a genus of snakes of the family Typhlopidae. The genus is endemic to Asia.

Species
The genus Indotyphlops contains the following 23 species which are recognized as being valid.
Indotyphlops ahsanai 
Indotyphlops albiceps  - white-headed blind snake
Indotyphlops braminus  - flowerpot snake, Brahminy blindsnake, bootlace snake
Indotyphlops exiguus  - Belgaum worm snake 
Indotyphlops filiformis  - file worm snake
Indotyphlops fletcheri 
Indotyphlops jerdoni  - Jerdon's worm snake
Indotyphlops lankaensis  - Sri Lanka worm snake 
Indotyphlops lazelli 
Indotyphlops leucomelas  - pied worm snake 
Indotyphlops longissimus  - long worm snake
Indotyphlops loveridgei  - Loveridge's worm snake
Indotyphlops madgemintonae 
Indotyphlops malcolmi  - Malcolm's worm snake 
Indotyphlops meszoelyi  - Darjeeling worm snake
Indotyphlops mollyozakiae  - Molly Ozaki’s blind snake 
Indotyphlops pammeces  - South India worm snake 
Indotyphlops porrectus  - slender worm snake
Indotyphlops schmutzi  - Schmutz's worm snake
Indotyphlops tenebrarum 
Indotyphlops tenuicollis  - Samagutin worm snake
Indotyphlops veddae  - Vedda worm snake
Indotyphlops violaceus  - violet worm Snake

Nota bene: A binomial authority in parentheses indicates that the species was originally described in a genus other than Indotyphlops.

References

Further reading
Hedges, S. Blair; Marion, Angela B.; Lipp, Kelly M.; Marin, Julie; Vidal, Nicolas (2014). "A taxonomic framework for typhlopid snakes from the Caribbean and other regions (Reptilia, Squamata)". Caribbean Herpetology 49: 1-61. (Indotyphlops, new genus, pp. 37–38).

 
Indotyphlops